California's major ports have long traditions of maintaining dedicated fireboats, and, soon after Al Qaeda's attack on September 1st, 2001, FEMA started issuing port security grants equipping fireboats for Californias smaller ports, that are also equipped to work when hazardous materials have been released.

See also
 Fireboats of Long Beach, California
 Fireboats of San Diego
 Fireboats of San Francisco

References

 
Water transportation in California
Firefighting in California